Can Demir Aktav (born 31 August 1994) is a Turkish footballer player who plays as a defender for Çankaya.

Professional career
Aktav was a youth footballer for Konya Anadolu Selçukspor, and was a constant starter for them before his transfer to Konyaspor. Can made his professional debut for Konyaspor in a 2-1 Süper Lig win over Çaykur Rizespor on 21 January 2017.

References

External links
 

1994 births
People from Seyhan
Living people
Turkish footballers
Association football defenders
1922 Konyaspor footballers
Konyaspor footballers
Adana Demirspor footballers
Tuzlaspor players
Süper Lig players
TFF First League players
TFF Second League players
TFF Third League players